Empis femorata  is a species of fly in the family Empididae. It is included in the subgenus Euempis. It is found in the  Palearctic.

References

External links
Images representing Empis at BOLD
Ecology of Commanster

Empis
Insects described in 1798
Asilomorph flies of Europe